Wei Cai is a Professor of mechanical engineering at Stanford University.

Early life and career
In 1995, Cai received his Bachelor of Science degree in optoelectronics from Huazhong University of Science and Technology in Hubei province, China. In 2001, Cai received a Ph.D. in nuclear engineering from Massachusetts Institute of Technology and immediately after it became a postdoc at the Lawrence Livermore National Laboratory where he remained until 2004. In July 2004, Cai became an assistant professor of mechanical engineering at Stanford University, and in September 2011 was promoted to associate professor.

Memberships
Wei Cai is a member of numerous societies including: American Nuclear Society, American Physical Society, Materials Research Society, Alpha Nu Sigma Honor Society of American Nuclear Society and Sigma Xi.

Works
2006 – Computer Simulations of Dislocations
2016 – Imperfections in Crystalline Solids

References

External links

20th-century births
Living people
Chinese mechanical engineers
Huazhong University of Science and Technology alumni
MIT School of Engineering alumni
Lawrence Livermore National Laboratory staff
Stanford University faculty
Year of birth missing (living people)